The 2011 Georgia Bulldogs football team represented the University of Georgia in the 2011 NCAA Division I FBS football season. The Bulldogs were led by 11th-year head coach Mark Richt and played their home games at Sanford Stadium. They are a member of the Eastern Division of the Southeastern Conference. They finished the season 10–4, 7–1 in SEC play to be champions of the Eastern Division. They represented the division in the SEC Championship Game where they lost to Western Division representative LSU 42–10. They were invited to the Outback Bowl where they lost to Michigan State 33–30 in three overtimes.  The 2011 season marked the first time since 1981 that UGA swept three of its biggest SEC rivals: Florida, Auburn and Tennessee; this feat would be repeated in the 2012 season.

Personnel

Coaching staff

Schedule

Game summaries

Boise State

Georgia opened up the 2011 season against the Boise State Broncos in the Chick-fil-A Kickoff Game held in the Georgia Dome. The matchup was only the second in both schools' history, the previous meeting being in 2005 where Georgia won 48–13 in Athens. The game initially got off to a slow start, until Georgia scored first late in the first quarter. However, in the second half, Boise State was able to pull away with 3 touchdowns to make the final score 35–21. Notably, both teams wore Nike Pro Combat jerseys as part of an agreement.

South Carolina

Georgia's first conference game was against the South Carolina Gamecocks, the defending champion of the SEC's Eastern Division. Despite major improvements following the Boise State game, as well as three Carolina turnovers, the Bulldogs failed to win their first SEC game of the season.

Coastal Carolina

Following two losses, Georgia looked to get its first victory over the FCS Chanticleers. For the first time since 2000, the game was not sold out. However, Georgia outplayed the Chanticleers to get their first win as well as their first shutout since a 2010 win over the Vanderbilt Commodores.

Ole Miss

Georgia game against the Ole Miss Rebels was considered the first true road game of the season. While Bulldogs were able to rack up 24 points in the first half, they would only score 3 points in the second half. However, the Georgia defense was able to hold Ole Miss to 13 points, granting the Bulldogs their first conference win.

Mississippi State

In a home game against the Mississippi State Bulldogs, the Georgia offense manages to rack up 21 points during the first half while holding Mississippi State to a field goal. However, Georgia again had issues scoring in the second half, only scoring a field goal. However, Mississippi State would only score one more touchdown in the fourth quarter, allowing Georgia to improve to 3–2.

Tennessee

Coming into this game, Georgia had not won an away game at Tennessee since 2005. In addition, the last two visits to Tennessee had been lopsided victories in favor of Tennessee. Early offensive problems led to a tie game at halftime. However, Georgia would score 14 points in the second half, for a 20–12 win. The win was historic in that it was the 100th career win at Georgia for head coach Mark Richt.

Vanderbilt

Georgia's game against Vanderbilt was a difficult win, though the Bulldogs would eventually win 33–28.

Florida

    
    
    
    
    
    
    
    

Georgia and Florida both came off a bye week coming to the game, with the game considered a must-win for Georgia coach Mark Richt. Meanwhile, Florida coach Will Muschamp had guaranteed a win over Georgia. Florida quarterback John Brantley made his return following an ankle sprain four weeks prior. During the game, Georgia's special teams problems became apparent as Florida was able to make huge returns, while Georgia kicker Blair Walsh missed two field goals. Near the end of the first half, the Gators were up 17–3, when Georgia chose to convert a 4th down and long for a touchdown rather than attempt a field goal. In the second half, the Gators were held to 3 points, but maintained a lead well into the 4th quarter, when Georgia running back Richard Samuel scored on a 4 yd run. Georgia would manage to hold off Florida despite poor field position to win 24–20.

New Mexico State

The 2011 Homecoming game saw one of the all-time great performances over a single quarter by a Georgia Bulldogs teams. QB Aaron Murray threw for 238 yards and 5 touchdowns as Georgia scored 42 points in the second quarter to open up a 49–3 lead at the half. Murray never came back into the game and the second and third strings added 14 more points on their way to a 63–16 rout of the Aggies. The games marks the most yards gained and the most points scored in the Mark Richt era.

Auburn

    
    
    
    
    
    
    
    

This matchup was played on November 12, 2011 3:30 PM 
Considered the "Deep South's Oldest Rivalry"
Pregame The Georgia Bulldogs are favored to win by 17 but Auburn Tigers fans are hungry to disrupt Georgia's 
seven-game winning streak. 
Both teams strike quickly with Georgia scoring first a few minutes into the first quarter. 
Auburn immediately answered on the ensuing drive with a touchdown making it 7–7. Auburn sputtered and never scored again or had the lead. 
Georgia went on a romp with QB Aaron Murray throwing four touchdown passes in the first half going 14–18 (no interceptions) surpassing former Georgia QB 
(current NFL QB of the Detroit Lions) Matthew Stafford's single season touchdown record of 25. 
Georgia Safety Bacarri Rambo's pick six on Auburn QB Clint Moseley seals the momentum for the Bulldogs and after an impressive start Georgia Bulldogs 
are up 35–7 over Auburn Tigers at the half.
Georgia's defense stepped up again to hold Auburn to 51 yards rushing and 144 yards passing in the game with 3 forced turnovers. 
In the second half Georgia pounded the ball on the ground and only tried two pass plays, scoring a field goal and touchdown dominating the 2010 defending national champion Auburn Tigers 45–7, the largest routing of Auburn by a Georgia Bulldogs team since 1946.

Time Of Possession was lopsided.
Georgia TOP 40:55  
Georgia total offense: 528
Georgia Rushing: 304
Georgia Passing: 224
Georgia 3rd Down: 12 of 15
Georgia Turnovers: 2
Auburn TOP 19:05
Auburn total offense: 195
Auburn Rushing: 51
Auburn Passing: 144
Auburn 3rd Down: 3 of 11
Auburn Turnovers: 3

Kentucky

Georgia Tech

LSU–SEC Championship Game

Michigan State–Outback Bowl

Rankings

References

Georgia
Georgia Bulldogs football seasons
Georgia Bulldogs football